Jack Courier (1915– 2007), a.k.a. John, was an Australian Modernist printmaker, painter and teacher.

Early life and education 
Courier was born in 1915 in Elwood, Victoria. As a young man he took various jobs including work as a salesman in country towns.

He studied at the school established by George Bell and Arnold Shore at 443 Bourke Street, Melbourne, which became a centre for modernist art in Melbourne. He exhibited with the George Bell Group in 1949 and with the Melbourne Contemporary Artists in 1952. An early review by The Age art critic of the exhibition of the George Bell Group in their annual exhibition at the Victorian Artists' Society's Gallery, Albert Street, East Melbourne, noted that his painting The Red Chair was, and one by Peter Cox, were works "by younger men that impress".

Career 
Like other Australian printmakers, including Fred Williams, Ian Armstrong, Janet Dawson and Robert Grieve, Courier went to study abroad. From 1950 to 1951 he travelled in Europe, then funded by a British Council Bursary returned to England 1954–1956 to study painting, drawing, lithography with Lynton Lamb and Ceri Richards and also etching at the Slade School. On his return to Melbourne, he set up the first printmaking department at Prahran Technical School. Not long after his return he exhibited paintings, drawings and lithographs made in London at Peter Bray Gallery in March 1957. The Age art critic wrote of "the newcomer" as;"an artist of Integrity and personal feeling. Working in the subdued English light he has evolved a low-toned, misty style in his oils, which leaves him little tonal range. But within the limits he allows himself he can create an effect of depth and space which enriches his quiet canvases [...] The color is deliberately unobtrusive, but it Is an organic part of these works," going on to remark on his skilful draughtsmanship to conclude that "he is almost certainly an artist to watch."The conservative magazine The Bulletin wryly commented;"Jack Courier is a Melbourne artist who went to London and more-or-less starved there while he studied at the Slade School. He emerged therefrom with a technical equipment sufficient to enable him to produce lithographs and drawings of bits of old London with a line which is often heavy and unfeeling, but sometimes light and expressive. His oils have an elusive quality about them as if painted in the twilight."His friend and colleague Peter Jacobs organised the acquisition of Courier’s works by the National Gallery of Australia, where Roger Butler, a senior curator remarked that "Jack is arguably Australia’s finest stone lithographer..."

Teaching 
Courier taught at Caulfield Technical College where he introduced the teaching of lithography, at Prahran College, and Swinburne Technical College. He also taught silk screening and drawing at Pentridge Gaol.

Courier was a foundation member of the Print Council of Australia and exhibited with them, including in touring shows.

Personal life 
Later in life Courier married painter Mary McLeish, a member of the Women Painters and Sculptors society. The couple exhibited together and she was frequently a finalist in the Archibald Prize. Mary's daughter was Barbara Courier McLeish (born 1936).

Exhibitions

Solo 
 1957, 19–28 March: Peter Bray Gallery
 1966, from 30 January: Exhibition of paintings and prints by Jack Courier. North Adelaide Galleries
 1991, 28 November – 18 December: Eastgate Gallery
 2009: Castlemaine Art Gallery and Historical Museum
 1963, May: Landscapes. Concurrent with solo show by wife Mary McLeish. Australian Galleries, Collingwood
 1989: Jack Courier, lithographs and oils. Eastgate Gallery 
 2003: Lithographs and gouaches by Jack Courier. The Rotunda, Hong Kong

Group 
 1952, Melbourne Contemporary Artists annual exhibition. Victorian Artists Society, East Melbourne
 1992: Classical Modernism: The George Bell Circle. National Gallery of Victoria
 1970, March: Leveson Street Gallery, North Melbourne

Collections 

 National Gallery of Australia
 Art Gallery of New South Wales
 Art Gallery of South Australia
 National Gallery of Victoria
 Castlemaine Art Museum
 Latrobe Valley
 Mildura
 Warrnambool

Awards 
1975: Alice Springs Prize (print acquired)

References 

1915 births
2007 deaths
20th-century Australian artists
Australian printmakers
Australian lithographers
People from Elwood, Victoria
Businesspeople from Melbourne
Artists from Melbourne
20th-century male artists
20th-century lithographers